Tejparkash Singh Brar (25 October 1937 – 21 June 2012) was a Kenyan field hockey player. He competed at the 1956 Summer Olympics and the 1964 Summer Olympics.

References

External links
 

1937 births
2012 deaths
Kenyan male field hockey players
Olympic field hockey players of Kenya
Field hockey players at the 1956 Summer Olympics
Field hockey players at the 1964 Summer Olympics
Sportspeople from Nairobi
Kenyan people of Indian descent
Kenyan people of Punjabi descent
Alumni of the Birmingham School of Art
Kenyan expatriates in the United Kingdom